Claymont is a census-designated place (CDP) in New Castle County, Delaware. The estimated 2017 population of the 19703 ZIP code, which Claymont encompasses, was 15,292.

History
The community now known as Claymont started on the banks of Naamans Creek where it empties into the Delaware River. This once rich ecosystem has been occupied steadily since before 1200 A.D. and has undergone numerous cultural and economic changes, most of which are still evident in the architecture and living patterns of the community today. The first residents were aboriginal Indians of the Middle Woodland period (1100-1600 B.C.). Evidence of these early dwellers has been found along both sides of Naamans Creek. The Dutch named the creek and settlement after the Chief of the Lenape Indians who occupied the region. The settlement grew rapidly from the 17th century through the 20th century, first with gristmills, farms, and related ancillary industries, and later with lumber mills, a steel mill, and a chemical plant.

In 1681, John Grubb purchased a one-third interest in a 600-acre tract of the Brandywine Hundred which came to be known as Grubb's Landing.

Sitting strategically along the Delaware River, Claymont has been a two-way thoroughfare for travel to and from Philadelphia and Washington, D.C., since colonial days. During the colonial period, the town served as a stop along the King's Highway, and with its location at the confluence of Interstate 95, Interstate 495, US 13 (Governor Printz Boulevard) and US 13 Bus. Philadelphia Pike has long been a thoroughfare for travel between Philadelphia (20 miles to the north) and Washington, D.C. (100 miles to the south).

In 1838, the newly constructed Philadelphia, Wilmington, and Baltimore Railroad built a station in Claymont. The area developed from a primarily agricultural community to a suburban resort area for wealthy Philadelphia families, and in the early 20th century into an industrial working community. It has included the suburban subdivdisions of Claymont Addition, Brookview, Worthland, and Woodstream Gardens.

Naamans became Claymont in 1856 after the Reverend John B. Clemson, pastor of the Episcopal church, relocated with his family from their plantation, Claymont Court, in Charles Town, West Virginia.

Claymont, with its diverse population, has continued to maintain a strong sense of community. The community's religious, civic, historic, and social organizations play a major role in supporting its unique character.

Renaissance
Since the mid 1990s, several major revitalization efforts have been completed, including renovations of historical sites such as the Claymont Stone School, the Darley House and the Robinson House. The Claymont Renaissance Development Corporation, a nonprofit organization working to stimulate economic growth and residential improvement in Claymont, received a Sustainable Communities Award from the National Association of Counties. In what has been called "the single largest redevelopment project in Brandywine Hundred in the last 40 years", the 633-unit,  community of Brookview was razed beginning in 2007 to make way for the new urbanist, mixed use Darley Green development. In 2017, plans were announced for the redevelopment of the former 450 acre Claymont Steel site. In 2019 construction began on the $71M Claymont Regional Transportation Center which will replace the current small commuter rail stop one half mile to the south.

Geography

Claymont is located at  (39.8006685, -75.4596404), in northeastern Brandywine Hundred, on the ridge line between the coastal floodplain of the Delaware River and the upland piedmont area of northwestern New Castle County.

The area generally considered to be Claymont encompasses the entire 19703 ZIP code, which is bounded by the Pennsylvania border to the north, the Delaware River to the east, the CSX railroad line to the west, and Perkins Run creek to the south.

Law and government

County representation

The New Castle County Government operates under an Executive-Council form of municipal government. The county is headed by a County Executive, who is elected to a maximum of two consecutive, four-year terms. The Chief Administrative Officer, who is the County's second-in-command, is appointed by the County Executive and serves at his or her pleasure. The current County Executive is Matt Meyer, and the current Chief Administrative Officer is Vanessa Phillips.

The county's legislative body is a thirteen-member County Council, consisting of twelve members elected by district and one Council President elected at large. Claymont falls within New Castle County District 8, which is represented by Councilman John Cartier.

State representation

Claymont is in the 7th District of the Delaware House of Representatives, and is in the 1st District of the Delaware Senate. 
Both members of the Democratic Party, Larry Lambert represents Delaware House District 7, and Sarah McBride represents Senate District 1.

Federal representation

Democratic Congresswoman Lisa Blunt Rochester represents the State of Delaware in its entirety.

Claymont is represented in the United States Senate by Democrats Tom Carper and Chris Coons.

The United States Postal Service has an office on Philadelphia Pike in Claymont.

Fire

The Claymont Fire Co. has two locations, one of which is located in Claymont on Philadelphia Pike.

Police

The New Castle County Division of Police has jurisdiction over all unincorporated areas in New Castle County, Delaware. The department has about 400 law enforcement officers. The current Chief of Police is Vaughn Bond. Claymont is also under the jurisdiction of the Delaware State Police.

Demographics

The ZIP Code Tabulation Area for 19703 includes communities such as Ashbourne Hills, the Greentree section, the Society Hill Section, and parts of Rolling Park, which are neighborhoods located within Claymont. The area had a population of 14,471 with a total of 5,984 households at the 2010 Census. The racial makeup of the area was 61.83% White, 31.41% African American, 7.72% Hispanic, 0.89% Native American, 4.75% Asian, 0.12% Pacific Islander, and 3.48% from other races. As of 2010, the median household income for the 19703 ZIP code was $58,304 with an average of 2.42 persons per household.

Education
Claymont is in the Brandywine School District.

Archmere Academy, a private school, is in Claymont.

Transportation

Major roads that serve Claymont include Interstate 95, Interstate 495, US 13 (Governor Printz Boulevard), US 13 Bus. (Philadelphia Pike), and DE 92 (Naamans Road). Claymont Station is a SEPTA Regional Rail train station on the Wilmington/Newark Line, providing service north to Center City Philadelphia and south to Wilmington and Newark. Trains along Amtrak's Northeast Corridor pass through Claymont but do not stop; the nearest Amtrak station is Wilmington Station. DART First State provides bus service to Claymont along Route 13, which runs from the Northtowne Plaza in Claymont south along Philadelphia Pike to Wilmington; Route 31, which runs from the Claymont Station south along Philadelphia Pike to Wilmington; and Route 61, which runs from the Claymont Station west along Naamans Road to the Brandywine Town Center and the Concord Mall. SEPTA Suburban Bus Route 113 runs from the Northtowne Plaza in Claymont north into Delaware County, Pennsylvania, providing service to the Chester Transportation Center in Chester, the Darby Transportation Center in Darby, and the 69th Street Transportation Center in Upper Darby.

Places of interest

Claymont is home to several historic places, including the Claymont Stone School, est. 1805 (which may have been the state's first racially integrated public school), Archmere Academy, est. 1916 (in the former home of industrialist John J. Raskob), the Darley House, est. 1859 (former home of illustrator F. O. C. Darley), the Grubb/Worth Mansion, erected in 1783, and the Robinson House (with a Block House believed to be the only structure remaining of the original Naaman's Creek settlement).

Notable people

 Valerie Bertinelli, One Day at a Time and Touched by an Angel actress
 Joe Biden, 46th President of the United States and former U. S. Senator and Vice President 
 John Carney, Governor of Delaware
 J. Caleb Boggs, former Governor of Delaware, U. S. Representative,  and U. S. Senator
 F. O. C. Darley, known as the "Father of American Illustration"
 John Grubb, two-term member of the Pennsylvania Provincial Assembly, one of the original settlers of Claymont
 Nathaniel Grubb, served in the Pennsylvania Colonial Assembly
 Keith "Bang Bang" McCurdy, celebrity tattoo artist
 John J. Raskob, DuPont and General Motors executive
 Adolf Ulric Wertmüller, Swedish portrait painter

References

External links

Claymont Renaissance Development Corporation

Census-designated places in New Castle County, Delaware
Census-designated places in Delaware
Delaware populated places on the Delaware River